Due to changes in sea level, Japan has at various times been connected to the continent by , with continental Russia to the north via the Sōya Strait, Sakhalin, and the Mamiya Strait, and with the Korean Peninsula to the southwest, via the Tsushima Strait and Korea Strait. Land bridges also connected the Japanese Islands with each other. These land bridges enabled the migration of terrestrial fauna from the continent and their dispersal within Japan.

Geological background
Around 25 million years ago, the Sea of Japan began to open, separating Japan from the continent and giving rise to the Japanese island arc system of today. The Sea of Japan as a back-arc basin was open both to the northeast and to the southwest by 14 Ma, while marine transgression further contributed to the isolation and insulation of Japan. Due to the level of tectonic activity in the area and significant subsidence of the Japanese Islands since the Miocene, exact quantification of historic sea level changes is problematic.

Northern land bridge
Based on current depths, a  reduction in sea level would be sufficient to connect Hokkaidō with the mainland.

Western land bridge

Kuril land bridge
A  has been insufficient to connect Hokkaidō with Kamchatka during the Quaternary. The southern Kuril land bridge that connected Kunashiri and the Lesser Kurils to Hokkaidō during the Early Holocene was insufficient with the rising sea level at around 6,000 BP.

Seto land bridges
Honshū, Shikoku, and Kyūshū are separated by shallow straits that rarely exceed  in depth. Consequently, they were frequently connected together as a single land mass.

Tsugaru land bridge

Ryūkyū land bridge
The Ryūkyū Islands, separated by deeper straits still (the Tokara Gap), have been isolated from the main islands throughout the Quaternary. The  was sufficient temporarily to connect Miyako-jima with Taiwan during the late Middle Pleistocene, allowing for the migration of the Steppe mammoth (Mammuthus trogontherii). During this period, the Miyako Strait was sufficient to prevent the land bridge reaching Okinawa Island.

See also
 List of prehistoric mammals of Japan

References

Landforms of Japan
Geology of Japan
Historical geology
Biogeography